Weber Thesis can refer to:
 Rationalization (sociology) (Rationalisation thesis)
 The Protestant Ethic and the Spirit of Capitalism

See also
 Monopoly on violence
 Secularisation
 Max Weber